Trade Secret was a chain of clothing, accessories and home furnishing stores operated by TJX Companies and had 35 stores across Australia by April 2017. The stores were located in Sydney, Melbourne, Brisbane, Canberra, Newcastle, Wollongong, Cairns, Townsville, Toowoomba, Albury, the Sunshine Coast and the Gold Coast. On 3 February 2017, they announced on their website that they would soon be rebranding all existing locations as T.K. Maxx and opening new locations across the east coast. As of 20 April 2017 the stores were operating as T.K. Maxx.

TJX acquired Trade Secret for AUD$80 million from Gazal Corporation in 2015.

Home Secret
Parent company TJX also operates Home Secret, a 'sister' store of Trade Secret, which carries home furnishings. As of January 2016, there is one location in Kawana, Queensland.

See also
T.J.Maxx
T.K. Maxx
Marshalls
Sierra Trading Post
TJX Companies

References

External links
TK Maxx Australia Official Website
Trade Secret Official Website

TJX Companies
Trade Secret
1992 establishments in Australia
Defunct retail companies of Australia
Defunct department stores of Australia
Australian companies disestablished in 2017
Retail companies disestablished in 2017